Garrison is an at-grade light rail station on the W Line of the RTD Rail system. It is located near the intersection of West 13th Avenue and Garrison Street, after which the station is named, in Lakewood, Colorado.

The station opened on April 26, 2013,  on the West Corridor, built as part of the Regional Transportation District (RTD) FasTracks public transportation expansion plan and voter-approved sales tax increase for the Denver metropolitan area.

Garrison station is located in a residential neighborhood and has no bus connections or park and ride lot. The station has a covered bicycle parking area and the W Line Bikeway connects the station to neighborhoods west of the station.

References 

Transportation in Lakewood, Colorado
RTD light rail stations
W Line (RTD)
Railway stations in the United States opened in 2013
2013 establishments in Colorado
Transportation buildings and structures in Jefferson County, Colorado